(born January 11, 1981) is a former professional baseball player in Japan. Doi for a period played for the Yokohama BayStars.  Doi played as a pitcher.

References

1981 births
Living people
Hosei University alumni
Japanese baseball players
Nippon Professional Baseball pitchers
Yokohama BayStars players
Chiba Lotte Marines players